The 54th World Science Fiction Convention (Worldcon), also known as L.A.con III, was held on 29 August–2 September 1996 at the Hilton Anaheim, Anaheim Marriott, and the Anaheim Convention Center in Anaheim, California, United States.

The convention was chaired by Mike Glyer.

Participants 

Attendance was 6,703.

Guests of Honor 

 James White (writer)
 Roger Corman (media)
 Takumi Shibano & Sachiko Shibano (fan)
 Elsie Wollheim (special guest of honor; died before the convention)
 Connie Willis (toastmaster)

Awards

1996 Hugo Awards 

The 1996 Hugo Award base includes a reel of film and a moonscape as seen in the 1950 film Destination Moon, as an homage to both that film and the work of artist Chesley Bonestell.

 Best Novel: The Diamond Age by Neal Stephenson
 Best Novella: "The Death of Captain Future" by Allen Steele
 Best Novelette: "Think Like a Dinosaur" by James Patrick Kelly
 Best Short Story: "The Lincoln Train" by Maureen F. McHugh
 Best Non-Fiction Book: Science Fiction: The Illustrated Encyclopedia by John Clute
 Best Dramatic Presentation: "The Coming of Shadows" (Babylon 5 episode)
 Best Original Artwork: Dinotopia: The World Beneath by James Gurney
 Best Professional Editor: Gardner Dozois
 Best Professional Artist: Bob Eggleton
 Best Semiprozine: Locus, edited by Charles N. Brown
 Best Fanzine: Ansible, edited by Dave Langford
 Best Fan Writer: Dave Langford
 Best Fan Artist: William Rotsler

1946 Retro Hugo Awards 

 Best Novel: The Mule by Isaac Asimov (Astounding, November/December 1945)
 Best Novella: Animal Farm by George Orwell (Secker & Warburg)
 Best Novelette: "First Contact" by Murray Leinster (Astounding, May 1945)
 Best Short Story: "Uncommon Sense" by Hal Clement (Astounding, September 1945)
 Best Dramatic Presentation: The Picture of Dorian Gray
 Best Professional Editor: John W. Campbell, Jr.
 Best Professional Artist: Virgil Finlay
 Best Fanzine: Voice of the Imagi-Nation, edited by Forrest J Ackerman
 Best Fan Writer: Forrest J Ackerman
 Best Fan Artist: William Rotsler

Other awards 

 John W. Campbell Award for Best New Writer: David Feintuch

See also 

 Hugo Award
 Science fiction
 Speculative fiction
 World Science Fiction Society
 Worldcon

References

External links 

 NESFA.org: The Long List
 NESFA.org: 1996 convention notes 

1996 conferences
1996 in California
1996 in the United States
Science fiction conventions in the United States
Worldcon